Notiodrassus is a genus of South Pacific ground spiders that was first described by E. B. Bryant in 1935.  it contains only two species, both found in New Zealand: N. distinctus and N. fiordensis.

References

Araneomorphae genera
Gnaphosidae
Spiders of New Zealand